Melton Broncos Rugby League Football Club is an Australian rugby league football club based at Melton, Victoria formed in 2013 and debuted their season in 2014. They conduct teams for both junior and senior rugby league teams. In summer they run a touch football competition.

Notable  Juniors

See also

Rugby league in Victoria

References

External links
Melton Broncos Fox Sports pulse

Rugby league clubs in Melbourne
Rugby league teams in Victoria (Australia)
Rugby clubs established in 2013
2013 establishments in Australia
Sport in the City of Melton